Aphanosara is a genus of moth in the family Cosmopterigidae. It contains only one species, Aphanosara planistes, which is found in Puerto Rico.

References

External links
Natural History Museum Lepidoptera genus database

Cosmopteriginae
Monotypic moth genera
Moths of the Caribbean